George Washington was a state legislator in Mississippi. He represented Carroll County, Mississippi in the Mississippi House of Representatives in 1874 and 1875.  He was documented as being "mulatto".

See also
African-American officeholders during and following the Reconstruction era

References

Year of birth missing
Year of death missing
People from Carroll County, Mississippi
Members of the Mississippi House of Representatives
African-American politicians during the Reconstruction Era
African-American state legislators in Mississippi